Open House Chicago (OHC) is a free weekend festival held annually in Chicago that allows participants to visit dozens of buildings that are not typically open to the public. The next festival will be held on 16–17 October 2021 because 2020 was scrapped caused by the COVID-19 pandemic.

OHC is organized by the Chicago Architecture Foundation over a two-day period each year in mid-October. The event promotes appreciation of architecture by the general public.

OHC began in 2011 and it is part of a worldwide network of Open House events that started with Open House London in 1992. Its organizers state that event objectives include enabling participants to “venture into new neighborhoods, learn the stories of Chicago’s architecture and experience the diversity and culture of each community.” OHC is an important event for tourism in Chicago. Funding for the event comes from the Chicago Architecture Center and from corporate sponsors, government agencies, foundations, and individual donors. The event relies on approximately 2,600 volunteers to staff participating buildings.

Dates and attendance

Sites

Sites include spaces inside historic and architecturally significant buildings that aren't generally open to the public, including historic mansions, Frank Lloyd Wright homes, theaters, skyscrapers, exclusive private clubs, opulent hotel ballrooms and suites, rooftops, industrial sites and  design and architecture offices.

Highlights include Tribune Tower, Kemper Building, Federal Reserve Bank of Chicago, Fine Arts Building, Chicago Board of Trade Building, The Rookery, Aon Center, Chicago Temple Building, Emil Bach House, Elks National Memorial, New Regal Theater and more.

See also
 Chicago Architecture Foundation
 Open House New York
 Open House London
 Doors Open Toronto
 Open House Brno

References

External links
Open House Chicago Homepage
Chicago Architecture Center Website
Open House Worldwide

Annual events in Illinois
Architecture in Chicago
Chicago
Recurring events established in 2011